Gigi Raven Wilbur is an American bisexual rights activist and writer. They have a bachelor's degree in philosophy and a master's degree in social work.

Career and activism 
Wilbur was a state organizer in Texas with a bisexuality radio show, and a coordinator for BiNet USA. In 1999, the first Celebrate Bisexuality Day was organized by them, Wendy Curry, and Michael Page; to quote Wendy Curry, "We were sitting around at one of the annual bi conventions, venting and someone, I think it was Gigi said we should have a party. We all loved the great bisexual, Freddie Mercury. His birthday was in September, so why not Sept? We wanted a weekend day to ensure the most people would do something. Gigi's birthday was Sept 23rd. It fell on a weekend day, so poof! We had a day."

Wilbur said,

Personal life 
As of 2008, Wilbur lives in Houston, Texas, and is the coordinator of the adult campground and the sex-positive Temple of Aphrodite at Dragons Wylde Ranch.

Wilbur is intersex, and have said they identifies as third gender, neither male nor female. Wilbur stated in a 2008 interview, "my birth gender was altered shortly after I was born ... I am hermaphrodite. That is my true gender." They accepts any pronouns, but prefers they/them.

Awards
In 1999, Wilbur was awarded the American Institute of Bisexuality Globe Award for outstanding service to the bisexual world community.

Selected works 
They are the author of The Dominant's Handbook: An Intimate Guide to BDSM Play, and published the essay "Walking in the Shadows: Third Gender and Spirituality" (about being intersex) in Trans/Forming Feminism, Trans-feminist Voices Speak Out, edited by Krista Scott-Dixon. As of 2008, they publish a column in the pagan publication Rogue Moon.

References

1955 births
Living people
American feminists
BDSM writers
Bisexual rights activists
American bisexual writers
Intersex non-binary people
American LGBT rights activists
Non-binary writers
Sex-positive feminists
Intersex writers
Non-binary activists
Bisexual non-binary people